"Wiggle It" is a song by American music duo 2 in a Room, released as their second single from their second album, Wiggle It (1990). It is to date the act's biggest hit in the United States and abroad, peaking at number three in Australia, Ireland and the United Kingdom as well as number 15 in the United States.

Critical reception
Alex Henderson from AllMusic commented, "Hardcore rappers may have dismissed Wiggle It's hit title song as commercial frivolity, but there's no denying just how infectious the house-influenced jam is." Bill Coleman from Billboard stated that this "deep-baked hip-house sports a muscular bassline and well-phrased rhymes."

Chart performance
The single reached the number-one position on the US Billboard Dance Club Play chart and number 15 on the Billboard Hot 100 in 1990. It also reached number three in the United Kingdom, Ireland and Australia. The single earned a gold certification in Australia and the US and a silver certification in the UK.

Track listing
 12-inch vinyl (US)
A1. "Wiggle It" (The Club Mix) (7:39) 
A2. "Wiggle It" (The Dub Mix) (5:50) 
B1. "Wiggle It" (Def Wiggle Mix) (9:25) 
B2. "Wiggle It" (Def Wiggle Dub) (5:45)

Charts and certifications

Weekly charts

Year-end charts

Decade-end charts

Certifications

Release history

Covers
In 2008, Australian singer Ricki-Lee Coulter used the chorus from the song for her own version, also titled "Wiggle It," which reached number 11 on the Australian ARIA Singles Chart in September 2008, eight positions below the original version. 2 in a Room received writing credits on this single as well.

References

External links
 Single release information at Discogs

1990 singles
1990 songs
Charisma Records singles
Hip house songs
SBK Records singles